Chesapeake was an American bluegrass band formed in 1994 in Bethesda, Maryland as a direct offshoot from The Seldom Scene.

History
Mike Auldridge, T. Michael Coleman, and Moondi Klein, who played together in Seldom Scene in the mid '90's didn't feel satisfied with the way John Duffey led the group with only occasional playing and keeping their day jobs. All of them wanted to play more seriously and started to play outside the Seldom Scene.  The three formed Chesapeake along with Jimmy Gaudreau, mandolinist of the Tony Rice Unit. This occurred in mid to late 1994, after the release of their last album with the Seldom Scene, "Like We Used to Be".
Chesapeake stayed together for five years and then disbanded; Mike Auldridge to pursue his own solo music, while Jimmy Gaudreau and Moondi Klein continued to play together as a duo.

Music style
Chesapeake's music style cannot be clearly defined, as it is a blend of bluegrass, progressive bluegrass, folk, folk-rock, country, rock and more. Folk songwriters such as Tom Paxton and Steve Gillette influenced their music as well as rock performers such as Van Morrison and Little Feat. Their music was strongly led by Dobro and mandolin with Auldridge adding lap steel and pedal steel guitar to their arrangements. Later on the band added more percussion to their music.

Members
 Moondi Klein - lead vocals, guitar
 Mike Auldridge - Dobro, lap steel, pedal steel, guitar, vocals
 Jimmy Gaudreau - mandolin, guitar, vocals
 T. Michael Coleman - bass guitar, vocals

with
 Pat McInerney - percussion, drums

Discography
During the short time the group was together (1994–1999), they released 3 studio albums. A compilation of live recordings was released in 2014.
 Rising Tide (Sugar Hill, 1994)
 Full Sail (Sugar Hill, 1996)
 Pier Pressure (Sugar Hill, 1997)
 Hook, Live & Sinker (Chesterbury, 2014)

References

External links
Official site of Mike Auldridge
Official site of Jimmy Gaudreau and Moondi Klein
Official site of Jimmy Gaudreau

Musical groups established in 1994
Musical groups from Maryland
American bluegrass music groups
American folk musical groups
American folk rock groups
1994 establishments in Maryland